The VIII Memorial of Hubert Jerzy Wagner was held in Poland from 20 to 22 August 2010. 4 teams participated in the tournament.

Qualification
All teams except the host must receive an invitation from the organizers.

Squads

Venue

Results
All times are Central European Summer Time (UTC+02:00).

Final standing

Awards
MVP:  Murilo Endres
Best Spiker:  Matey Kaziyski
Best Blocker:  Piotr Nowakowski
Best Server:  Lukáš Ticháček
Best Setter:  Marlon Muraguti
Best Receiver  Dante Amaral
Best Libero:  Teodor Salparov

References

External links
 Official website

Memorial of Hubert Jerzy Wagner
Memorial of Hubert Jerzy Wagner
Memorial of Hubert Jerzy Wagner